Pickering Interfaces is a test and measurement company headquartered in Clacton-on-Sea, United Kingdom.  Pickering designs, manufactures and markets a range of switching, simulation and cabling products in the LXI, PXI, and PCI platforms.  These products are sold into the functional test, hardware-in-the-loop simulation (HILS) and design verifications markets.

Pickering is a privately owned company with design and manufacturing facilities in Clacton-on-Sea, UK and Trinec in the Czech Republic, together with additional company operated direct sales and support operations in the USA, Germany, France, Sweden and China.

Principal product range
Pickering's primary products are in the PXI, LXI, USB and PCI platforms, specifically in switching, programmable resistors, attenuators, power supplies, basic instrumentation, software and cabling for these products.

Pickering Interfaces group of companies
 Pickering Interfaces Ltd, Clacton-on-Sea, England.
 PIckering Interfaces Inc, Chelmsford, MA USA.
 Pickering Interfaces s.r.o., Trinec, Czech Republic.
 Pickering Interfaces GmbH, Haar-Salmdorf, Munich, Germany.
 Pickering Interfaces SARL, Noisel, Paris, France.
 Pickering Interfaces AB, Varberg, Sweden.
 品英仪器（北京）有限公司, 北京, China.

References

External links
 Pickering Interfaces web site
 Pickering Electronics reed relay web site
 PXI book - an overview of the PXI standard
 LXI book - an overview of the LXI standard
Switching book - an overview of switching for automated test systems

Technology companies of the United Kingdom